Pure Country is a 1992 American drama musical western film directed by Christopher Cain and starring George Strait in his acting debut, with Lesley Ann Warren, Isabel Glasser and Kyle Chandler. The film, while profitable with box office receipts of over $15 million against a $10 million budget,  fell far short of its expectations. However, the soundtrack was a critical success and, to date, is Strait's best selling album. It was followed by two direct-to-video sequels, Pure Country 2: The Gift (2010) and Pure Country: Pure Heart (2017), with the former also being directed by Cain. This movie marked Rory Calhoun's last film appearance.

Plot 
An audience shouts "Dusty!", a band begins to play amid smoke and lights, and Wyatt "Dusty" Chandler enters the stage to play his hits. Dusty feels that his elaborate stage show is overwhelming his music, a suspicion confirmed one night when he purposely omits several bars of a chart-topping hit, "Where the Sidewalk Ends". When his fans don't even notice, Dusty cuts the performance short. Dusty reminisces about simpler times with his drummer and best friend, Earl. Without telling his manager, Lula, he decides to "take a walk", but does not say exactly where he is going or for how long. Dusty was waiting for his truck, and he hitches a ride. After shaving his beard and cutting off his ponytail, Dusty heads for the small farm town where he grew up, visiting his wise old grandmother. Later that day, he visits a bar where he and Earl played prior to making it big. That evening, Dusty hangs around for some relaxation and discovers Harley Tucker dancing and smiling at Dusty. Al, Harley's drunk and rugged friend, get into an argument in the parking lot over Dusty, who neither have ever seen or met. Dusty, while drunk, comes to assist Harley with Al, who won't stop bothering her. Al punches Dusty and he falls to the ground. Harley brings him home, a reward for defending her honor. While Dusty is enjoying his new freedom, his concert in Shreveport was cancelled. Meanwhile, Buddy Jackson comes on stage, disguised as Dusty himself, and lip-syncing to a recording of Dusty. Covered by lights and smoke, the gimmick works. Meanwhile, Dusty stays on at the ranch, paying room and board and taking roping lessons, all the while earning the respect of Harley's father, Ernest. Ernest confides in Dusty that he is forced to slowly sell pieces of the ranch. Harley is determined to save the struggling spread with victory in a Las Vegas rodeo.

Buddy confronts Lula after his "performance" and demands $100,000 and a recording contract. He lies to the media that Lula paid him to keep imitating Dusty. Lula, realizing she's in trouble, reaches out to Earl to find Dusty. She then follows him to Dusty's location. Realizing he has feelings for Harley and will not leave, Lula tells Harley that Dusty is married to her. Harley dumps Dusty and Lula is waiting to scoop him up to return to his band and career. Now back with his band, he demands that his stage shows be toned down.

Dusty confronts Buddy about the lie he told the press. Dusty threatens to sue Buddy if he ever shows his face in country music again and Buddy leaves. Lula is grateful for his intervention to which Dusty brings up Harley's name. His first appearance after his "vacation" is in Las Vegas at the same time as the rodeo Harley Tucker is competing in.  Lula secretly arranges for Harley and her family to get tickets to Dusty's Show. Once seated she sends an attendant to get Harley where she admits the truth to her. True to his wishes, he does the show without all the smoke and the lights, and sits on the edge of the stage, playing guitar and singing "I Cross My Heart", a special love song he has composed for her, which wins him Harley's forgiveness. The two hug at the edge of the stage.

Cast and characters
 George Strait as Wyatt "Dusty" Chandler
 Lesley Ann Warren as Lula Rogers
 Isabel Glasser as Harley Tucker
 Kyle Chandler as Buddy Jackson
 John Doe as Earl Blackstock
 Rory Calhoun as Ernest Tucker
 Molly McClure as Grandma Ivy Chandler
 James Terry McIlvain as Tim Tucker
 Toby Metcalf as J.W. Tucker
 Mark Walters as Al
 Tom Christopher as Dave - Dusty's Bodyguard
 Jeffrey R. Fontana as Eddie - Dusty's Bodyguard
 Jeff Prettyman as Bobby Lewis
 David Anthony as Dusty's Band
 Mike Daily as Dusty's Band
 Gene Elders as Dusty's Band
 Benny MacArthur as Dusty's Band
 Terry Hale as Dusty's Band
 Ronnie Huckaby as Dusty's Band
 Mike Kennedy as Dusty's Band
 Rick McRae as Dusty's Band
 Sharon Thomas as Monique James
 Julie Johnson as Waitress
 Gil Glasgow as Bartender

Production 
Pure Country was filmed in 1991 throughout Texas, but mostly in Maypearl.

The graveyard scene was shot at Cresson Cemetery in Cresson, Texas, and the concert sequences were filmed at concert venues in Fort Worth, including North Side Coliseum and Will Rogers Coliseum.

The bar scenes where Dusty meets Harley were filmed at Western Kountry Klub, located between Midlothian and Mansfield Tx.

Box office
Despite Strait's popularity in the music world, Pure Country only grossed $15 million at the box office. Although the expectations had been higher for Strait's first major film role, this did not stop the soundtrack album from becoming the best-selling album of Strait's career to date.

Critical reception
The film received mainly negative reviews upon its release, but critics responded positively to certain aspects of the film. It has a score of 41% on Rotten Tomatoes, based on 22 reviews, with an average rating of 4.7 out of 10.

On the television program Siskel and Ebert in 1992, film critics Gene Siskel and Roger Ebert both gave the film a "Two thumbs down" rating, but their reviews were more mixed than negative. Both praised George Strait's performance, feeling that he was a convincing actor in the lead, especially considering the challenges of a singer becoming an actor, and they both enjoyed Isabel Glasser's performance, but felt the film was undermined by a hokey story, and no moments for satire which would have made the film better. Film critic Leonard Maltin, in his annual Movie and Video Guide, also gave the film a mainly negative but somewhat mixed review, giving it two stars out of four and wrote: "This Strait showcase is mostly pure tedium, though the film picks up some in hour two with the appearance of Glasser, and Rory Calhoun as her father".

Sequels
A sequel to Pure Country, Pure Country 2: The Gift was released on October 15, 2010. Pure Country 2: The Gift has no storyline connection to the original film written by Rex McGee. Instead, it focuses on a young woman's struggles to become a country singer. George Strait appears as himself, but not as a central character of the film.

A third film titled, Pure Country: Pure Heart was released for a direct-to-video on August 1, 2017. This film has no storyline connection to the original film, either, and no original characters make any appearances.

Soundtrack 
 See Pure Country (soundtrack)

References

External links 

 
 
 
 1992 George Strait Interview About Pure Country Part 1
 1992 George Strait Interview About Pure Country Part 2

1992 films
1990s English-language films
1992 romantic drama films
American romantic drama films
Country music films
American Western (genre) films
1992 Western (genre) films
Films directed by Christopher Cain
Films scored by Steve Dorff
Films set in Fort Worth, Texas
Films shot in Texas
Warner Bros. films
1990s American films